Berlinguer ti voglio bene (internationally released as Berlinguer, I Love You) is a 1977 Italian comedy film written and directed by Giuseppe Bertolucci. It is the debut film of both Bertolucci and Roberto Benigni.

It is based on the stage play Cioni Mario di Gaspare fu Giulia, that the same Bertolucci wrote and directed in 1975 and in which Benigni played the character of Mario Cioni, a character he later resumed in the variety television Onda libera. The title quotes Cioni's declaration of love for Enrico Berlinguer, then leader of the Italian Communist Party.

Plot 
Mario is a guy of the underclass of Tuscany, who works as a construction worker. His friends make him jokes, while Mario lives in the myth of Enrico Berlinguer, trusting into indifference. Mario is very attached to his mother, because he has the Oedipus complex, and when he loses a game of poker with a friend, this tells Mario about having sex with his mother: this is the penalty cause of the game. Mario is disgusted, but gradually he falls in love with his mother, who however rejects him and prefers to go to bed exactly with the friend who offered to Mario the cruel bet. So Mario finds his friend as a stepfather.

Cast 
 Roberto Benigni: Mario Cioni
 Alida Valli: La Mamma
 Carlo Monni: Bozzone
 Mario Pachi: Gnorante

References

External links
 
 

Linda Brodo, Stefano Brugnolo, Modernity degraded of the peripheries: an analysis of «Berlinguer, ti voglio bene», in "Intersezioni" 3/2014, pp. 473–498, Il Mulino.

1977 films
1977 comedy films
Films directed by Giuseppe Bertolucci
Films set in Prato
Italian comedy films
Italian films based on plays
1970s Italian-language films
1970s Italian films